Well I Never may refer to:
 A song on Flesh & Blood (Whitesnake album)
 A B-side single by Hedge and Donna
 A regional name for the drinking game "Never have I ever"